Tazza: The Hidden Card (lit. Tazza: Hand of God) is a 2014 South Korean gambling film directed by Kang Hyeong-cheol based on Huh Young-man and Kim Se-yeong's manhwa of the same name. It is followed by Tazza: One Eyed Jack, released in 2019.

After Ham Dae-gil enters the gambling world, he is set up as the fall guy in a crooked deal. To get revenge, he enters a final game which could be fatal to the loser.

Cast

Choi Seung-hyun (T.O.P) as Ham Dae-gil
Jung Yoon-seok as young Dae-gil
Shin Se-kyung as Heo Mi-na
Kwak Do-won as Jang Dong-sik
Lee Hanee as President Woo
Yoo Hae-jin as Ko Gwang-ryeol
Kim Yoon-seok as Agui
Han Joon-woo as Choi Wang-geun	
Lee Geung-young as Kko-jang
Kim In-kwon as Heo Gwang-chul, Mi-na's older brother
Oh Jung-se as Director Seo
Park Hyo-joo as Little Madam
Go Soo-hee as Madam Song
Kim Joon-ho as Yu-ryeong ("Ghost")
Lee Dong-hwi as Jjari ("Worth")
Kim Won-hae as Artist Jo
Lee Jun-hyeok as Benjie ("Pliers"), Dae-gil's helper
Kim Min-sang as Dr. Hwang
Jo Kyung-hyun as young Mr. Kim
Son Sang-gyeong as Father Jang
Park Soo-young as Chang-sik
Im Jung-eun as Dae-gil's mother
Lee Dong-yong as Auto repair owner
Ha Seong-gwang as The Dark Knight of Ansan
Song Jae-ryong as Gambling den bouncer
Kim Dae-myung as Billiards hall owner
Yoon Kyung-ho as Gambler in billiards hall
Nicky Lee as Ppappa
Bae Yu-ram as "Halibut"
Ahn Jae-hong as Woon-do
Jung Da-won as Joong-ki
Cha Seung-ho as Bribed detective
Kwak Soo-jung as Wife of auto repair owner
Lee Joon-ik as O-ring man (cameo)
Oh Yeon-soo as Woman at the observatory (cameo)
Yeo Jin-goo as Agui's pupil (cameo)
Cha Tae-hyun as Radio DJ (cameo)

Production
Due to the box office success of Choi Dong-hoon's gambling epic Tazza: The High Rollers (it attracted 6.84 million in admissions in 2006, making it one of the highest-grossing Korean films that year), production company Sidus FNH announced a sequel, with Jang Joon-hwan originally attached as screenwriter/director and a release planned for late 2008. But pre-production was later halted, and Jang pulled out of the film.

Speculation about a sequel continued, given that Tajja, the famous local comic series (or "manhwa") illustrated by Huh Young-man and written by Kim Se-yeong that served as the 2006 film's source material comes in four volumes, each with entirely different characters and settings. Tazza 2 is based on the second volume Tazza: Hand of God, which was published on November 16, 2006, by Random House Korea.

In 2012, Kang Hyeong-cheol signed on to direct the sequel, and casting was finalized in late 2013, with Choi Seung-hyun as lead character Ham Dae-gil, the nephew of Goni, the protagonist in Tazza: The High Rollers.

Filming began on January 2, 2014, at a pool hall in Cheongnyangni-dong, Seoul.

Awards and nominations

References

External links 
 
 
 

2010s crime drama films
South Korean crime drama films
Films about gambling
Films about hanafuda
Films based on manhwa
2010s Korean-language films
Lotte Entertainment films
Films directed by Kang Hyeong-cheol
Live-action films based on comics
South Korean sequel films
2010s South Korean films